"New York, New York" is a song from the 1944 musical On the Town and the 1949 MGM musical film of the same name. The music was written by Leonard Bernstein and the lyrics by Betty Comden and Adolph Green. A well known line of this song is:

For the film version, the word "helluva" was changed to "wonderful" to appease the Production Code offices. In the film, the song was performed by Gene Kelly, Jules Munshin, and Frank Sinatra. In 2004, the film version finished at No. 41 in AFI's 100 Years...100 Songs survey of top tunes in American cinema.

It is not to be confused with the "Theme from New York, New York", originally performed by Liza Minnelli and later popularized by Sinatra ("Start spreadin' the news, I'm leaving today"). However, in his Concert for the Americas performance, Sinatra sang this song as the verse for his more famous "Theme from New York, New York."

In popular culture
"New York, New York" was referenced by John Williams for his celebratory For New York, composed in 1988 for Bernstein's 70th birthday gala.

The song was parodied as "Springfield, Springfield" in the 1993 episode "Boy-Scoutz 'n the Hood" of The Simpsons. A sailor even appears as another homage to the song, until he realizes he isn’t in New York (which Bart points out).

A pastiche of the song entitled "Twenty-four Hours In Tunbridge Wells" was written and performed by Eric Idle and Neil Innes, with Gillian Gregory, for an episode of the same name in the second season of the UK comedy series Rutland Weekend Television in 1976.

It was covered in a mash-up with "I Love New York" on the Glee episode "New York".

In the Tim Burton film Sleepy Hollow, Johnny Depp's Ichabod Crane utters "The Bronx is up and the Battery's down" to his traveling party in the final scene.

Alex, Marty, Gloria, and Melman sing the chorus of the song in Madagascar 3: Europe's Most Wanted.

The song was parodied in an episode of The Critic ("New York, New York, a terrible town/The sky is brown and the water is brown").

Leonard Bernstein himself conducts the song in a New York Medley during the Night of 100 Stars in 1985.

During Wheel of Fortune's first road trip to New York in 1988, the song was played over an image montage of the city, and the lyrics were altered from "It's a helluva town" to "It's a wonderful town".

The first issue of Sam and Max: Freelance Police opens with Sam singing a parody of the song's chorus. ("The mimes are food for the bums underground.")

References

Film theme songs
1944 songs
Songs about New York City
Songs with music by Leonard Bernstein
Songs with lyrics by Betty Comden
Songs with lyrics by Adolph Green